Sir William James Bailhache KC (born 24 June 1953) is a Jersey lawyer who was Bailiff of Jersey from 29 January 2015 until 11 October 2019. He is the brother of Sir Philip Bailhache who previously served as Bailiff.

He was educated at Charterhouse School and Merton College, Oxford.

He held the position of Her Majesty's Attorney General in Jersey for almost 10 years before being sworn in as the island's Deputy Bailiff on 2 November 2009 and then as Bailiff 29 February 2015 until 11 October 2019.

He was made a Knight Bachelor in the 2017 Birthday Honours.

References

Living people
1953 births
People educated at Charterhouse School
Alumni of Merton College, Oxford
Bailiffs of Jersey
Jersey lawyers
Knights Bachelor
Lawyers awarded knighthoods